Esther Mcheka Chilenje is a Malawian politician from the Democratic Progressive Party. She was MP for Nsanje North from 2014 to 2021.

Career 
Mcheka Chilenje served as Deputy Ambassador to the United Nations.

She was elected to Parliament in the 2014 general election and served as deputy speaker. On 19 June 2019, Catherine Gotani Hara was elected the first female Speaker of the National Assembly, with 97 votes to 93, over Mcheka Chilenje. She was defeated in a by-election in 2021.

References 

Living people
Women legislative deputy speakers
Democratic Progressive Party (Malawi) politicians
Members of the National Assembly (Malawi)
21st-century Malawian women politicians
21st-century Malawian politicians
Permanent Representatives of Malawi to the United Nations
Year of birth missing (living people)